Kenneth James D. Tuffin (born 5 May 1997) is a Filipino-New Zealand basketball player for the Wellington Saints of New Zealand's National Basketball League (NZNBL).

Early life and education
Tuffin was born on 5 May 1997 in New Zealand, spending his childhood in Wellington. As a child, Tuffin had watched games of the New Zealand National Basketball League and his father used to take him to basketball games.

For his high school studies, Tuffin attended St. Patrick's College in Upper Hutt. He was widely involved in his high school's academic program, playing for St Patrick's basketball, cricket, and rugby teams.

He moved to the Philippines at age 18 to pursue collegiate studies at the Far Eastern University in Manila.

Collegiate career
Tuffin played for the FEU Tamaraws basketball team which played at the University Athletic Association of the Philippines (UAAP). FEU did not finish outside the Final Four, in all seasons that Tuffin played (Season 79 to 82; 2016–2019). In Season 82, Tuffin was made captain of the Tamaraws.

After Season 82, Tuffin secured a stint with Taranaki Mountainairs of New Zealand's National Basketball League (NBL) while retaining his amateur status allowing Tuffin to return to FEU for Season 83 in 2021, his last season of eligibility. However Tuffin forwent his final year of eligibility after Season 83's cancellation due to the COVID-19 pandemic.

New Zealand NBL

Taranaki Mountaineers
Tuffin was the 44th overall selection in New Zealand NBL for the 2020 season. He was selected by the Taranaki Mountainairs. Prior to the draft, Tuffin secured consent from FEU to play in the NBL and joined the league as an amateur player.

He plans to play professionally after he graduates from FEU and is open to the possibility in playing in the Philippine Basketball Association. However in December 2020, he decided to forego his final year of eligibility to play for FEU after UAAP Season 83's cancellation and decided to turn professional.

Wellington Saints
After suiting up for the Taranaki Mountaineers, Tuffin moved to the Wellington Saints for the 2021 season. Tuffin was acquired by Wellington after the team decided to skip the 2020 season. He continued on with the Saints in 2022 and 2023.

National team career
Tuffin is eligible to play for the national teams of the Philippines and New Zealand. He is among the 23 youths included in the Philippines' #23for23 pool of players for the 2023 FIBA World Cup. He was also included in New Zealand's pool for the 2020 Summer Olympics and the 2022 Commonwealth Games.

Personal life
Tuffin's mother was born in Rosario, La Union and has relatives living in the provinces of Pampanga and Pangasinan.

References

1997 births
Living people
FEU Tamaraws basketball players
Filipino men's basketball players
New Zealand men's basketball players
Sportspeople from Wellington City
Taranaki Mountainairs players
Wellington Saints players
Small forwards
New Zealand people of Filipino descent
Citizens of the Philippines through descent